Nélson Fernandes (born 3 August 1946), known as Nélson, is a retired Portuguese international footballer who played as an attacking midfielder.

External links

1946 births
Living people
Sportspeople from Funchal
Portuguese footballers
Madeiran footballers
Association football midfielders
Primeira Liga players
Liga Portugal 2 players
Varzim S.C. players
S.L. Benfica footballers
Sporting CP footballers
C.S. Marítimo players
Portimonense S.C. players
S.C. Salgueiros players
F.C. Tirsense players
SC Vianense players
Leça F.C. players
Portugal under-21 international footballers
Portugal international footballers